is one of the most renowned Japanese photographers of the 20th century. He is most celebrated as a photojournalist, though he may have been most prolific as a photographer of Buddhist temples and statuary.

Biography
Domon was born in Sakata, Yamagata Prefecture, and, as a young man, was deeply influenced by the philosophical writings of Tetsuro Watsuji. He studied law at Nihon University, but was expelled from the school due to his participation in radical politics. He moved from painting to portrait photography, and obtained a position with Kotaro Miyauchi Photo Studio in 1933. In 1935 he joined Nippon Kōbō to work on its magazine Nippon. Four years later he moved to Kokusai Bunka Shinkōkai, a national propaganda organization; like Ihei Kimura and many other notable Japanese photographers, he helped the war effort. Both contributed to a propaganda magazine, Shashin Shūhō, during the war.

With the end of the war, Domon became independent and documented the aftermath of the war, focusing on society and the lives of ordinary people. He became known as a proponent of realism in photography, which he described as, "an absolute snapshot that is absolutely not dramatic." He was a prolific contributor to photographic magazines, revived or started afresh through the early 1950s. With Kimura, Hiroshi Hamaya and others, he rejected posed and other artful photographs; in his polemics in the photographic magazines, Domon was the most forceful exponent of this view. He famously defined his goal as "the direct connection between camera and motif."

Among Domon's most powerful images are those taken in the first decade or so after the war, particularly those of the survivors of the atomic bombing of Hiroshima, the life and particularly the children in a poor coal-mining community in Chikuhō, Kyūshū), and the improvised play of children in Kōtō, Tokyo.

In 1958 Domon was awarded the Mainichi Photography Award and the Photographer of the Year Award from the Japan Photo Critics Association. He was given the Award of Arts award from the Ministry of Education in 1959 and the Japan Journalist's Congress Award in 1960. Domon suffered strokes in 1960 and 1968, which eventually prevented him from holding a camera and confined him to a wheelchair. This did not deter him from photography, and in documenting the traditional culture of Japan. He traveled energetically around the country, photographing its Buddhist temples in what would become an imposing series of luxuriously produced books. In 1963 he began work on the major work of his life, Koji junrei (1963–1975). Concerning his photographs of Japan's traditional culture, Domon wrote, "I am involved with the social realities of today, at the same time that I am involved with the traditions and classical culture of Nara and Kyoto, and these two involvements are linked by their common search for the point in which they are related to the fate of the people, the anger, the sadness, the joys of the Japanese people."

Domon's method of photographing these temples was to stay at the location for a time before taking the first photo. He would then begin photographing based not on a systematic, scholarly approach to the subject, but based on how his feelings towards the subjects moved him to record them. Domon prefaced the first volume of Koji Junrei with, "This is thus intended as a beloved book, a book which allows the individual Japanese to reconfirm the culture, the people which formed them."

In 1976 Domon was completely incapacitated by a third stroke, and he died in Tokyo on 15 September 1990. In 1981 Mainichi Newspapers established the annual Domon Ken Award in celebration of the 110th birthday of the Mainichi Shimbun; two years later, the Domon Ken Photography Museum was opened in Sakata.

Publications

Books by Domon

Nihon no chōkoku (日本の彫刻). Tokyo: Bijutsushuppansha, 1952.
2. Asuka jidai (飛鳥時代).
5. Heian jidai (平安時代).
Fūbō (風貌). Tokyo: Ars, 1953.
Murōji (室生寺). Tokyo: Bijutsushuppansha, 1955.
The Muro-ji, an eighth century Japanese temple: Its art and history. Tokyo: Bijutsu Shuppansha, c. 1954. Text by Roy Andrew Miller.
With 渡辺勉. Gendai geijutsu kōza (現代芸術講座 写真). 1956.
Murōji (室生寺). Tokyo: Bijutsushuppansha, 1957.
Domon Ken sakuhinshū (土門拳作品集). Gendai Nihon shashin zenshū 2. 創元社, 1958.
Hiroshima (ヒロシマ) / Hiroshima. 研光社, 1958.
Chūsonji (中尊寺). Nihon no Tera 4. Tokyo: Bijutsushuppansha, 1959.
Saihōji, Ryūanji (西芳寺・竜安寺). Nihon no tera 10. Tokyo: Bijutsushuppansha, 1959.
Chikuhō no kodomotachi: Ken Domon shashinshū (筑豊のこどもたち：土門拳写真集). Patoria Shoten, 1960. 築地書館, 1977.
Chikuhō no kodomotachi: Ken Domon shashinshū. Zoku: Rumie-chan ha otōsan ga shinda (筑豊のこどもたち：土門拳写真集 続　るみえちゃんはお父さんが死んだ). Patoria Shoten, 1960.
Hōryūji (法隆寺). Nihon no Tera 6. Tokyo: Bijutsushuppansha, 1961.
Murōji (室生寺). Nihon no Tera 13. Tokyo: Bijutsushuppansha, 1961.
Kyōto (京都). Nihon no Tera. Tokyo: Bijutsushuppansha, 1961.
Nara (奈良). Nihon no Tera. Tokyo: Bijutsushuppansha, 1961.
 Masterpieces of Japanese sculpture Tokyo: Bijutsuhuppansha; Rutland, Vt.: Tuttle, 1961. Text by J. E. Kidder.
Kasuga (春日). Nihon no Yashiro 4. Tokyo: Bijutsushuppansha, 1962.
Koji junrei (古寺巡礼). 5 vols. Tokyo: Bijutsushuppansha, 1963–75. International edition (with English texts added to the Japanese): A Pilgrimage to Ancient Temples. Tokyo: Bijutsushuppansha, 1980.
Tōji: Daishinomitera (東寺: 大師のみてら). Tokyo: Bijutsushuppansha, 1965.
Shigaraki Ōtsubo (信楽大壷). Tokyo: Chūnichi Shinbun Shuppankyoku, 1965.
Sōfū; his boundless world of flowers and form. Tokyo: Kodansha International, 1966. Text by Teshigahara Sōfu.
Nihonjin no genzō (日本人の原像). Tokyo: Heibonsha, 1966.
Yakushiji (薬師寺). Tokyo: Mainichi Shinbunsha, 1971.
Bunraku (文楽). Kyoto: Shinshindō, 1972.
Tōdaiji (東大寺). Tokyo: Heibonsha, 1973.
 Nihon meishōden (日本名匠伝). Kyoto: Shinshindō, 1974. Portraits of the famous, mostly in color.
Koyō henreki (古窯遍歴). Tokyo: Yarai Shoin, 1974.
Shinu koto to ikiru koto (死ぬことと生きること). 築地書館, 1974.
 Watakushi no bigaku (私の美学, My aesthetics). Kyoto: Shinshindō, 1975. Domon photographs Japanese arts and architecture (in both black and white and color), and writes commentary on these.
Nihon no bi (日本の美). Nishinomiya: Itō Hamu Eiyō Shokuhin, 1978.
Shashin hihyō (写真批評). Daviddosha, 1978.
Nyoninkōya Murōji (女人高野室生寺). Tokyo: Bijutsushuppansha, 1978.
 Fūkei (風景). Tokyo: Yarai Shoin, 1976. Popular edition, Tokyo: Yarai Shoin, 1978.
Gendai chōkoku: Chōkoku no Mori Bijutsukan korekushon (現代彫刻: 彫刻の森美術館コレクション) / Sculptures modernes: Collection de The  Hakone Open-air Museum. Tokyo: Sankei Shinbunsha, 1979. With some French as well as Japanese text.
Shashin zuihitsu (写真随筆). Tokyo: Daviddosha, 1979.
Domon Ken Nihon no Chōkoku(土門拳日本の彫刻). Tokyo: Bijutsushuppansha.
1. Asuka, Nara (飛鳥・奈良). 1979.
2. Heian zenki (平安前期). 1980.
3. Heian kōki, Kamakura (平安後期・鎌倉). 1980.
Domon Ken: Sono shūi no shōgen (土門拳：その周囲の証言). Tokyo: Asahi Sonorama, 1980.
Nihon no bien (日本の美艶). Gendai Nihon Shashin Zenshū 7. Tokyo: Shūeisha, 1980.
Domon Ken Nihon no kotōji: Tanba, Imari, Karatsu, Eshino, Oribe, Tokoname, Atsumi, Shigaraki, Kutani, Bizen (土門拳日本の古陶磁：丹波・伊万里・唐津・絵志野・織部・常滑・渥美・信楽・九谷・備前). Tokyo: Bijutsushuppansha, 1981.
 Domon Ken (土門拳). Shōwa Shashin Zenshigoto 5. Tokyo: Asahi Shuppansha, 1982. A survey of Domon's work.
Domon Ken zenshū (土門拳全集). Tokyo: Shōgakukan.
1. Koji junrei 1 Yamato-hen jō (古寺巡礼 1 大和篇 上). 1983. .
2. Koji junrei 2 Yamato-hen ge (古寺巡礼 2 大和篇 下). 1984. .
3. Koji junrei 3 Kyōto-hen (京都篇). .
4. Koji junrei 4 Zenkoku-hen (古寺巡礼 4 全国篇). 1984. .
5. Nyonin Kōya Muroji (女人高野室生寺). 1984. .
6. Bunraku (文楽). 1985. .
7. Dentō no katachi (伝統のかたち). 1984. .
8. Nihon no fūkei (日本の風景). 1984. .
9. Fūbō (風貌). 1984. .
10. Hiroshima (ヒロシマ). 1985. .
11. Chikuhō no kodomotachi (筑豊のこどもたち). 1985. .
12. Kessakusen jō (傑作選 上). 1985. .
13. Kessakusen ge (傑作選 下). 1985. .
Domon Ken no koji junrei (土門拳の古寺巡礼). Tokyo: Shōgakukan, 1989–90.
1. Yamato 1 (大和1). 1989. .
2. Yamato 2 (大和2). 1990. .
3. Kyōto 1. (京都1). 1989. .
4. Kyōto 2. (京都2). 1990. .
5. Murōji (室生寺). 1990. .
Bessatsu 1. Higashi Nihon (東日本). 1990. .
Bessatsu 2. Nishi Nihon (西日本). 1990. .
Domon Ken Nihon no butsuzō (土門拳日本の仏像). Tokyo: Shōgakukan, 1992. .
Murōji (室生寺). Nihon Meikenchiku Shashinsenshū 1. Tokyo: Shinchōsha, 1992. .
Domon Ken no Shōwa (土門拳の昭和). Tokyo: Shōgakukan, 1995.
1. Fūbō (風貌). .
2. Kodomotachi (こどもたち). .
3. Nihon no fūkei (日本の風景). .
4. Dokyumento Nihon 1935–1967 (ドキュメント日本 1935–1967). .
5. Nihon no butsuzō (日本の仏像). .
Koji junrei (古寺巡礼). Tokyo: Mainichi Shinbunsha, c1995.
Domon Ken Koji Junrei (土門拳古寺巡礼). Tokyo: Bijutsu Shuppansha, 1996. . 
Shashin to jinsei: Domon Ken esseishū (写真と人生：土門拳エッセイ集). Dōjidai Raiburarī. Tokyo: Iwanami, 1997.
 Domon Ken (土門拳). Nihon no Shashinka. Tokyo: Iwanami, 1998. .
Koji junrei (古寺巡礼). Tokyo: Shōgakukan, 1998. .
風貌 愛蔵版 Tokyo: Shōgakukan, 1999. .
Domon Ken kottō no bigaku (土門拳骨董の美学). Korona Bukkusu 69. Tokyo: Heibonsha, 1999. . 
Domon Ken no tsutaetakatta Nihon (土門拳の伝えたかった日本) Tokyo: Mainichi Shuppansha, 2000. . 
Domon Ken Nihon no chōkoku (土門拳日本の彫刻 Tokyo: Mainichi Shinbunsha, c2000. Exhibition catalogue. 
Kengan (拳眼). Tokyo: Sekai Bunkasha, 2001. .
Kenshin (拳心). Tokyo: Sekai Bunkasha, 2001. .
Kenkon (拳魂). Tokyo: Sekai Bunkasha, 2002. .
逆白波のひと・土門拳の生涯 / 佐高信∥ Āto Serekushon. Tokyo: Shōgakukan, 2003.
Domon Ken tsuyoku utsukushii mono: Nihon bitanbō (土門拳強く美しいもの：日本美探訪) Shōgakukan Bunko. Tokyo: Shōgakukan, 2003. .

Books with works by Domon

Association to Establish the Japan Peace Museum, ed. Ginza to sensō (銀座と戦争) / Ginza and the War. Tokyo: Atelier for Peace, 1986. . Domon is one of ten photographers — the others are Shigeo Hayashi, Tadahiko Hayashi, Kōyō Ishikawa, Kōyō Kageyama, Shunkichi Kikuchi, Ihei Kimura, Kōji Morooka, Minoru Ōki, and Maki Sekiguchi — who provide 340 photographs for this well-illustrated and large photographic history of Ginza from 1937 to 1947. Captions and text in both Japanese and English.
(Joint work) Bunshi no shōzō hyakujūnin (文士の肖像一一〇人, Portraits of 110 literati). Tokyo: Asahi Shinbunsha, 1990. . Domon is one of five photographers — the others are Shōtarō Akiyama, Hiroshi Hamaya, Ihei Kimura and Tadahiko Hayashi. 
Kaku: Hangenki (核：半減期) / The Half Life of Awareness: Photographs of Hiroshima and Nagasaki. Tokyo: Tokyo Metropolitan Museum of Photography, 1995.  Exhibition catalogue; captions and text in both Japanese and English. There are 12 pages of photographs taken by Domon in 1957 and 1967 of Hiroshima, particularly of medical treatment; (other works are by Toshio Fukada, Kikujirō Fukushima, Shigeo Hayashi, Kenji Ishiguro, Shunkichi Kikuchi, Mitsugi Kishida, Eiichi Matsumoto, Yoshito Matsushige, Shōmei Tōmatsu, Hiromi Tsuchida and Yōsuke Yamahata). Text and captions in both Japanese and English.
 Mishima Yasushi (三島靖). Kimura Ihee to Domon Ken: Shashin to sono shōgai (木村伊兵衛と土門拳：写真とその生涯, Ihei Kimura and Ken Domon: Photography and biography). Tokyo: Heibonsha, 1995. . Reprint. Heibonsha Library. Tokyo: Heibonsha, 2004. . 
Dokyumentarī no jidai: Natori Yōnosuke, Kimura Ihee, Domon Ken, Miki Jun no shashin kara (ドキュメンタリーの時代：名取洋之助・木村伊兵衛・土門 拳・三木淳の写真から) / The Documentary Age: Photographs by Natori Younosuke, Kimura Ihei, Domon Ken, and Miki Jun. Tokyo: Tokyo Metropolitan Museum of Photography, 2001. An exhibition catalogue. Captions in both Japanese and English, other text in Japanese only.
Hiraki, Osamu, and Keiichi Takeuchi. Japan, a Self-Portrait: Photographs 1945–1964. Paris: Flammarion, 2004. . Domon is one of eleven photographers whose works appear in this large book (the others are Hiroshi Hamaya, Tadahiko Hayashi, Eikoh Hosoe, Yasuhiro Ishimoto, Kikuji Kawada, Ihei Kimura, Shigeichi Nagano, Ikkō Narahara, Takeyoshi Tanuma, and Shōmei Tōmatsu).
Kindai shashin no umi no oya: Kimura Ihee to Domon Ken (近代写真の生みの親：木村伊兵衛と土門拳) / Kimura Ihei and Domon Ken. Tokyo: Asahi Shinbunsha and Mainichi Shinbunsha, 2004. Catalogue of an exhibition. 
 Sengo shashin / Saisei to tenkai (戦後写真・再生と展開) / Twelve Photographers in Japan, 1945–55. Yamaguchi: Yamaguchi Prefectural Museum of Art, 1990.  Despite the alternative title in English, almost exclusively in Japanese (although each of the twelve has a potted chronology in English). Catalogue of an exhibition held at Yamaguchi Prefectural Museum of Art. Twenty of Domon's photographs of children in Tokyo appear on pp. 18–28.
Szarkowski, John, and Shōji Yamagishi. New Japanese Photography. New York: Museum of Modern Art, 1974.  (hard),  (paper).

Books on Domon

Satake Makoto (佐高信). Sakashiranami no hito: Domon Ken no shōgai (逆白波のひと・土門拳の生涯). Tokyo: Shōgakukan, 2003. .

References

Further reading

External links

 Domon Ken Photography Museum in the Sakata municipal site 
 Domon Ken Photography Museum requires Javascript and Flash 
 Ono, Philbert. Domon Ken.
 Ono, Philbert. Review of Domon Ken no tsutaetakatta Nihon.
 English Website

Japanese photojournalists
Portrait photographers
Street photographers
1909 births
1990 deaths
People from Yamagata Prefecture
Nihon University alumni
Recipients of the Medal with Purple Ribbon